Robert L. Kendrick is an American musicologist. He serves as the Robert O. Anderson Distinguished Service Professor at the University of Chicago. In 2019 Kendrick was awarded the Order of Merit of the Italian Republic 5th class (Knight) for his work in researching sacred Italian music from the Renaissance and Baroque eras.

Publications 
Selected works by Robert L. Kendrick:
 Fruits of the Cross: Passiontide Music Theater in Habsburg Vienna, 2018 
 Singing Jeremiah: Music and Meaning in Holy Week, 2014
 The Sounds of Milan, 1585-1650, 2002
 Celestial Sirens: Nuns and Their Music in Early Milan, 1996

References 

Year of birth missing (living people)
Living people
University of Pennsylvania alumni
New York University alumni
University of Chicago faculty
21st-century American musicologists
20th-century American musicologists